Bad Girls is the fifth studio album and first English-language album by Spanish recording artist Mónica Naranjo, it was recorded between 2000 and 2002, and released through Epic Records (Sony) on November 11, 2002. The album is marked as a promotional album – it is not considered an official CD from Mónica's discography and it is no longer available.

Recording and background
The album is the English-language version of her previous album Chicas Malas (2001). The album was originally planned to be released in March 2003, months after the release of Chicas Malas, later, the date was moved to September 2003, finally the album was released on November 11, 2003. This CD was sold only in Spain (as a gift to her fans) through her website, and Greece, the album was set to be released in the United States and Europe by Epic Records, but the release was cancelled. The radio remix by Steelworks of "I Ain't Gonna Cry" (English version of "No Voy a Llorar") was released as the first and only single from the album.

Five years after it was recorded, the album was finally released in the United States on May 9, 2006. Although the English-language versions of the ballads "De Qué Me Sirve Ya" ("Let The Love Begin") and "Lágrimas de Escarcha" ("If You Say You Love Me") were recorded, in order to be more danceable and commercial album, neither of the songs were included on the album's final track listing but remained unreleased until 2005, when both songs were released through her website.

Track listing

Personnel
Credits adapted from AllMusic.

Tracie Ackerman – Background vocals
Gregg Alexander – Producer, Vocal Programming
Robert Band – Assistant, Assistant Engineer
Luis Barbería – Background vocals
Gary Barlow – Musician, Programming
Manny Benito – Adaptation
Louis Biancaniello – Composer, Engineer, Keyboards, Mixing, Producer, Programming
Marc Blanes – Digital Editing, Engineer
Rich E. Blaze – Producer, Programming
Jamie Bridges – Assistant
Dario Caglioni – Digital Editing, Engineer
Natalia Calderón – Background vocals
Cesare Chiodo – Bass
Ben Coombs – Assistant Engineer
Ian Cooper – Mastering
Emanuela Cortese – Background vocals
Sheilah Cuffy – Background vocals
Stefano de Maco – Background vocals
Fausto Demetrio – Assistant Engineer
Giulia Fasolino –  Producer, Background vocals
Gina Foster – Background vocals
Maurizio Frabrizio – Classical guitar, Orchestra Director
Steven Garcia – Assistant Engineer
Alfredo Golino – Drums, Producer
Juan Gonzalez – Digital Editing, Engineer
Ramon Gonzalez – Congas
Mary Griffin – Background vocals
Isobel Griffiths – Orchestra Contractor
Khris Kellow – Producer, Programming

Eliot Kennedy – Musician, Programming
Tim Lever – Musician
Wally Lopez – Remixing
James Loughrey – Engineer, Mixing
Mario Lucy – Engineer, Mixing
Roberto Maccagno – Digital Editing, Engineer
Manuel Machado – Trumpet, Vocals (Background)
Avril Mackintosh – Digital Editing, Engineer, Vocal Engineer
David Massey – A&R
Paul Meehan – Producer
Segundo Mijares – Saxophone
Gary Miller – Guitar, Keyboards, Mixing, Producer, Programming, Remixing
Jordi Mora – Assistant Engineer
Pablo del Moral – Remixing
Mónica Naranjo –  Director, Primary Artist, Vocals (Background)
Ali Olmo – Background vocals
Mike Percy – Musician
Brian Rawling – Producer
John Reid – Background vocals
Chris Rodriguez – Spanish Guitar
Annie Roseberry – A&R
Cristóbal Sansano – Director, Executive Producer
Graham Stack – Producer
Joan Trayter – Mixing
Diane Warren – Executive Producer
Sam Watters – Engineer, Mixing, Producer, Background vocals
Tim Woodcock – Musician, Programming
Gavyn Wright – Orchestra Leader
Bruno Zuchetti – Arranger, Keyboards, Producer, Programming

Release history

References

2003 albums
Mónica Naranjo albums
Epic Records albums
Sony BMG albums
Albums produced by Louis Biancaniello
Albums produced by Sam Watters